Monaco competed at the 1988 Winter Olympics in Calgary, Alberta, Canada.

Competitors
The following is the list of number of competitors in the Games.

Alpine skiing

Men

Bobsleigh

References

Official Olympic Reports

Nations at the 1988 Winter Olympics
1988 Winter Olympics
1988 in Monégasque sport